Street Fighter Anniversary Collection is a bundle of two Street Fighter games: Hyper Street Fighter II, and Street Fighter III: 3rd Strike. It was released for the PlayStation 2 and Xbox. Both versions are nearly identical, but the latter version offered online competitive play. The PlayStation 2 version of the bundle was only released in North America, since the PS2 versions of Hyper Street Fighter II and 3rd Strike were released as separate stand-alone games in Japan, with the PAL region only receiving a separate release of Hyper Street Fighter II on the PS2. The Xbox version of the bundle was released in all three regions.

The initial Japanese release for Xbox was pulled from shelves within a week of release due to a sound bug. Though initially this was believed to be because the title was discovered to be region-free, Capcom confirmed the title's lack of regional lockout was not a mistake, but an intentional decision by the company.

The Xbox 360 is backwards compatible with the title.

Games

Hyper Street Fighter II - The Anniversary Edition

Hyper Street Fighter II is an arranged version of Super Street Fighter II Turbo that allows players to select from all playable incarnations of the characters that were featured in the five arcade installments of Street Fighter II. An earlier form of this concept was featured in the compilation Street Fighter Collection 2 (for the PlayStation), which included a "Deluxe Versus Mode" allowing two players to fight each other using characters from the first three versions of the game. Although originally released as a PlayStation 2 game in Japan, it saw a limited arcade release in Japan and Asia.

Hyper allows players to select from up to five different incarnations of the character roster: the original Street Fighter II, Champion Edition (Dash in Japan), Hyper Fighting (Dash Turbo in Japan), Super and Super Turbo (Super X in Japan). Each version of the characters play exactly as they were featured in said game (albeit minor bugs/changes, such as Super Sagats Tiger Shots and Vega's Wall Dive command), including the use of the same animation frames and voice actors. Players can pit a character from one version against one from another from a different game (i.e.: "Champ" Ken vs. "Super" Cammy, "Normal" Guile vs. "Turbo" Chun-Li). Rules from each game apply when selecting one's roster (for example, one cannot choose the same character as the other player if both are playing on "Normal" or play as the four bosses). In the single player game, all the opponents faced are in "Super T" mode.

The fighting stages use the same backgrounds and graphics from Super Turbo but restores a few breakable elements not seen since the original Street Fighter II: the Fūrinkazan signs in Ryu's stage; the dual barrels and stack of boxes in Ken's stage; and the lamp from E. Honda's stage. The character endings are the same as Super Turbo. The game also allows the option to set between CPS, CPS II and arranged renditions of the game's soundtrack (the arranged versions were originally used for the FM Towns and 3DO versions of Super and Super Turbo respectively). When using the CPS orchestration, CPS-style music from the obscure Japanese Sharp X68000 port of Super Street Fighter II is used for the "New Challengers" and Akuma, as they were not present in the original CPS SFII trilogy and thus did not originally have any CPS arrangements. All bonus stages are removed, although curiously, the background music is retained and can be found in the gallery section of the main menu.

In addition, the game also includes the opening and ending sequences from all five Street Fighter II games and an edited version of Street Fighter II: The Animated Movie as bonuses.

Street Fighter III 3rd Strike - Fight for the Future

The port of Street Fighter III 3rd Strike is primarily the same as the Dreamcast version of the game from 2000, with the added post-match grading system, increased hit detection accuracy with the Progressive Hit Frame System, and other extras over the arcade original. Additionally the Xbox version could be played online via Xbox Live (the Dreamcast version featured an online versus mode, but this feature was only available in the Japanese release).

Special feature
The animated feature Street Fighter II: The Animated Movie can also be found on the PlayStation 2 version, as well as the North American and European Xbox version. This version of the film is more censored than the PG-13 version in terms of language, the nudity in Chun Li's shower scene, and contains some other minor edits not related to mature or vulgar content.

Reception

References

External links
Capcom's official site for SFAC

STREET FIGHTER ANNIVERSARY COLLECTION ORIGINAL ONLINE

2004 video games
PlayStation 2 games
Street Fighter games
Capcom video game compilations
Video games developed in Japan
Xbox games